Michèle Raynaud (born Michèle Chaumartin;
) is a French mathematician, who works on algebraic geometry and who  worked with Alexandre Grothendieck in Paris in the 1960s at the Institut des hautes études scientifiques (IHÉS).

Biography 

Raynaud was a member of the  séminaire de géométrie algébrique du Bois Marie (SGA) 1 and 2 and obtained her doctorate in 1972, supervised by Grothendieck  at Paris Diderot University. Her thesis was entitled Théorèmes de Lefschetz en cohomologie cohérente et en cohomologie étale. Grothendieck wrote about her doctoral thesis in Récoltes et Semailles (p.168 Chapitre 8.1.) describing it as original, entirely independent, and a major work.

Michèle Raynaud was married to the mathematician Michel Raynaud who was also a member of the Grothendieck school.

Publications 
 Théorèmes de Lefschetz en cohomologie cohérente et en cohomologie étale, Bull. Soc. Math. France, Memoirs Nr. 41, 1975
 Théorèmes de Lefschetz en cohomologie étale des faisceaux en groupes non nécessairement commutatifs. C. R. Acad. Sci. Paris Sér. A-B 270 1970
 Théorème de représentabilité relative sur le foncteur de Picard
 Schémas en groupes. Séminaire de l'Institut des Hautes Etudes Scientifiques

Notes and references 

1938 births
20th-century French mathematicians
21st-century French mathematicians
Algebraic geometers
Living people